The A. A. Garcelon House is a historic house in the Main Street Historic District in Auburn, Maine. Built in 1890 for a prominent local businessman, it is one of the city's finest examples of Queen Anne Victorian architecture. It was listed on the National Register of Historic Places on June 13, 1986.

Description and history
The house stands on the west side of Main Street, south of Auburn's downtown, midway between Vine and Elm Streets. Its part of Main Street was once Auburn's most fashionable residential area. It is a -story wood-frame structure, with asymmetrical massing typical of the Queen Anne style. It is one of Auburn's finest Queen Anne Victorians, with projecting bay sections on its two street-facing sides and a projecting corner tower rising three stories, with a rounded roof. Bands of scallop-cut shingles separate the first and second floor and also fill the gable ends of the projecting bays. Spindle-work porches on both floors adorn the main facade. The interior of the house is largely unaltered, retaining period woodwork, including fireplace mantels and trim. A period carriage house was demolished in 1985.

The house was designed by Jefferson L. Coburn & Sons of Lewiston and built in 1890 for Arthur. A. Garcelon, a merchant of French Canadian extraction who operated a grocery supplier. Coburn was a prominent architect working in the Lewiston area during the last two decades of the 19th century.

See also
National Register of Historic Places listings in Androscoggin County, Maine

References

Houses in Auburn, Maine
Houses on the National Register of Historic Places in Maine
Houses completed in 1890
National Register of Historic Places in Androscoggin County, Maine
Individually listed contributing properties to historic districts on the National Register in Maine
Queen Anne architecture in Maine